The 1979 Ireland rugby union tour of Australia was a series of eight matches played by the Ireland national rugby union team in Australia in May and June 1979.

The tour was one of Ireland's most successful to date. Ireland won seven of the eight matches they played, including both tests against Australia. The only defeat came against Sydney. The tour also marked a notable episode in the rivalry between the two Ireland fly halves, Tony Ward and Ollie Campbell. Ward had been an ever present during both the 1978 and 1979 Five Nations Championships and he also played in the early games during this tour. However he was then dropped before the first test in favour of Campbell. Campbell subsequently emerged as man of the tour, setting an Irish record when he scored 60 points during the remaining games. On 3 June in Brisbane he scored 19 points, helping Ireland to a 27–12 victory. Campbell scored four penalties, one drop goal and converted two Colin Patterson tries. In the second test on 16 June Campbell scored two drop goals and a penalty as Ireland won 9–3. These two tests also marked the beginning and the end of the careers of two Ireland rugby legends. The first test saw the debut of Ciaran Fitzgerald while the second saw Mike Gibson make his final Ireland appearance. While on this tour Ned Byrne was the victim of a hit and run road accident which left his leg broken in three places.

Matches
Scores and results list Ireland's points tally first.

Test matches

Touring party

Manager: J. Coffey
Assistant Manager: Noel Murphy
Medical Officer: T.C.J. O’Connell
Captain: Fergus Slattery

Backs

Forwards

See also
History of rugby union matches between Australia and Ireland

References

Ireland national rugby union team tours of Australia
Ireland tour
tour
tour